UDPcast is a file transfer tool that can send data simultaneously to many destinations on a LAN. This can for instance be used to install entire classrooms of PCs at once. The advantage of UDPcast over using other methods (nfs, ftp, whatever) is that UDPcast uses the User Datagram Protocol's multicast abilities: it won't take longer to install 15 machines than it would to install just 2.

By default this protocol operates on the UDP port 9000. This default behaviour can be changed during the boot stage.

See also

List of disk cloning software

External links 
 

Free system software
Free backup software
Free software programmed in Perl
Cross-platform software
Disk cloning
Computer networking